James J. Browne is a former President of University of Galway. Appointed in 2008, he served a ten-year term, completed in January 2018. 

He is an engineering graduate of the University. He was awarded the degree of PhD by the University of Manchester in 1980 and appointed Personal Professor of Production Engineering at University of Galway in 1989.  He was awarded the degree of DSc by the University of Manchester in 1990 for published work on the analysis and design of computer integrated manufacturing systems.  He was elected Dean of the Faculty of Engineering in 1995 and Registrar and Deputy President of the University in 2000. 

Browne's research work focused on the design and operation of automated manufacturing systems with a particular emphasis on shop floor control and manufacturing execution systems (MES), Enterprise Management Systems, flexible manufacturing and assembly systems, reverse logistics, Industry 4.0 and Circular Manufacturing Systems. He published 11 books and over 400 papers; including 'Production Management Systems - An Integrated Perspective', 2nd edition Prentice Hall, 1996, which was translated into French, 'Les Systemes de production dans un environment CIM'  and published by AFNOR (1994);  'CAD CAM Principles, Practice and Manufacturing Management, Addison-Wesley, 1988, subsequently translated into Chinese by Prentice Hall.

Honours
Browne is a member of the Royal Irish Academy and a Fellow of the Irish Academy of Engineering.

Browne has received the title of Chevalier de l'Ordre des Palmes Académiques from the French Ambassador in Ireland, H.E. Jean-Pierre Thébault.

Family
Browne is married to Maeve. The couple have four sons: Lorcan, Shane, Ronan and Fergus, all of whom attended St Joseph's Patrician College and all of whom became engineering graduates during Browne's time as President of University of Galway.

He is the brother of Raymond Browne, the Bishop of the Roman Catholic Diocese of Kerry.

References

Living people
Year of birth missing (living people)
Place of birth missing (living people)
Alumni of the University of Galway
Members of the Royal Irish Academy
Presidents of the University of Galway
20th-century Irish engineers